Jorge Enrique Flores Yrahory (born February 1, 1994) is a Bolivian footballer currently playing for Always Ready.

References
 
 

1994 births
Living people
Sportspeople from Santa Cruz de la Sierra
Association football fullbacks
Bolivian footballers
Bolivia international footballers
Club Always Ready players
2021 Copa América players